A ship prefix is a combination of letters, usually abbreviations, used in front of the name of a civilian or naval ship that has historically served numerous purposes, such as identifying the vessel's mode of propulsion, purpose, or ownership/nationality. In the modern environment, prefixes are cited inconsistently in civilian service, whereas in government service a vessel's prefix is seldom omitted due to government regulations dictating that a certain prefix be used. Today the common practice is to use a single prefix for all warships of a nation's navy, and other prefixes for auxiliaries and ships of allied services, such as coast guards. For example, the modern navy of Japan adopts the prefix "JS" – Japanese Ship. However, not all navies use prefixes. Among the blue-water navies, those of France, Brazil, China, Russia, Germany, and Spain do not use ship prefixes. NATO designations such as FS (French Ship), FGS (Federal German Ship), and SPS (Spanish Ship) can be used if needed.

Usage
Historically, prefixes for civilian vessels often identified the vessel's mode of propulsion, such as "MV" (motor vessel), "SS" (screw steamer; often cited as "steam ship"), or "PS" (paddle steamer).

These days, general civilian prefixes are used inconsistently, and frequently not at all. In terms of abbreviations that may reflect a vessel's purpose or function, technology has introduced a broad variety of differently named vessels onto the world's oceans, such as "LPGC" (liquified petroleum gas carrier), or "TB" (tug-boat), or "DB" (derrick barge). In many cases though, these abbreviations are used for purely formal, legal identification and are not used colloquially or in the daily working environment. Prefixes indicating a vessel's purpose (e.g., "RMS" (Royal Mail ship) or "RV" (research vessel)) are also used.

Prefixes used for naval ships primarily reflect ownership, but may also indicate a vessel's type or purpose as a sub-set. Historically, the most significant navy was Britain's Royal Navy, which has usually used the prefix "HMS", standing for "His/Her Majesty's Ship". The Royal Navy also adopted nomenclature that reflected a vessel's type or purpose, e.g. HM Sloop. Commonwealth navies adopted a variation, with, for example, HMAS, HMCS, and HMNZS pertaining to Australia, Canada, and New Zealand, respectively.

In the early days of the United States Navy, abbreviations often included the type of vessel, for instance "USF" (United States Frigate), but this method was abandoned by President Theodore Roosevelt's Executive Order No. 549 of 1907, which made "United States Ship" (USS) the standard signifier for USN ships on active commissioned service. United States Navy prefixes officially only apply while a ship is in active commission, with only the name used before or after a period of commission and for all vessels "in service" rather than commissioned status.

However, not all navies used prefixes; this includes the significant navies of China, France and Russia.

From the 20th century onwards, most navies identify ships by letters or hull numbers (pennant numbers) or a combination of such. These identification codes were, and still are, painted on the side of the ship. Each navy has its own system: the United States Navy uses hull classification symbols, and the Royal Navy (e.g. 'D35' is destroyer 35 – HMS Dragon) and other navies of Europe and the Commonwealth use pennant numbers.

These tables list both current and historical prefixes known to have been used.

Generic (merchant navy) prefixes 

These prefixes are generally used for merchant vessels of any nationality.

National or military prefixes

Prefix conventions 
The designations for United Kingdom ships applied at the time of the British Empire, before the establishment of separate navies for the Dominions.

In the Royal Netherlands Navy, "HNLMS" is the prefix in English, a translation of the Dutch original "Hr.Ms." or "Zr.Ms.".  "Hr.Ms." should preferably not be used in English-language documents; nevertheless it is often seen on the World Wide Web. Until the moment a Dutch naval ship officially enters active service in the fleet, the ship's name is used without the prefix. Since King Willem-Alexander succeeded Queen Beatrix on 30 April 2013, "Hr.Ms." is replaced by "Zr.Ms.".

In Australia, the prefix NUSHIP is used to denote ships that have yet to be commissioned into the fleet.

In the United States, all prefixes other than "USS", "USNS", "USNV", and "USRC" were made obsolete in 1901, when President Theodore Roosevelt issued an Executive order fixing American naval nomenclature. USRC was replaced by USCGC when the Revenue Cutter Service merged with the United States Lifesaving Service to become the United States Coast Guard in 1915. USLHT also was replaced by USCGC when the United States Lighthouse Service became a part of the U.S. Coast Guard in 1939. USC&GS was replaced by NOAAS when the United States Coast and Geodetic Survey merged with other U.S. Government scientific agencies to form the National Oceanic and Atmospheric Administration (NOAA) in 1970. USFC was replaced by USFS when the United States Commission on Fish and Fisheries was reorganized as the U.S. Bureau of Fisheries in 1903, and USFS in turn was replaced in 1940 by US FWS when the Bureau of Fisheries merged with the United States Department of the Interior's Division of Biological Survey to form the Department of the Interior's Fish and Wildlife Service (which in 1956 was reorganized as the United States Fish and Wildlife Service). Seagoing ships Fish and Wildlife Service ships with the prefix US FWS that were transferred to NOAA when NOAA was created in 1970 switched to the NOAAS prefix.

A United States Navy ship that is not in active commission does not hold the title of United States Ship with simply the name without prefix used before and after commissioned service. Vessels, such as yard and harbor craft that are not commissioned and "in service" are officially referred to by name or hull number without prefix. Prior to commissioning, ships may be described as a pre-commissioning unit or PCU; for example, the USS Gerald R. Ford was described as the "pre-commissioning unit (PCU) Gerald R. Ford" prior to her commissioning in 2017.  Military Sealift Command (MSC) civilian crewed ships "in service" are given the prefix United States Naval Ship (USNS).

When it is stricken from the fleet list, a ship typically has the prefix "ex-" added to its name, to distinguish it from any active ships bearing the same name. For example, after USS Constellation (CV-64) was retired in 2003, she became referred to as ex-Constellation.

In science fiction 
Fictional equivalents of tri-letter prefixes frequently appear in English-language science fiction works, applied to seafaring and spaceborne ships alike.  
 Star Trek – the United Federation of Planets uses the prefix "USS" for its starships. Dialogue in earlier episodes of the series indicated that it referred to "United Space Ship". In the alternate "Mirror Universe", the Terran Empire use an "ISS" prefix instead. Other races use different prefixes for their ships:
 Klingons use IKS (Imperial Klingon Ship) or IKC (Imperial Klingon Cruiser).
 Romulan vessels typically receive the prefix IRW (Imperial Romulan Warbird), or RIS where some speculate that it means "Romulan Imperial Ship", and ChR. (ChR is from novelist Diane Duane's imagining of the Star Trek Universe, in which the Romulans refer to their home planet as "Ch'Rihan". Though Duane's version has a loyal following among many fans, it is not considered official Star Trek canon; similarly, the Ferengi designation of FMS, and the Cardassian CDS, are also not canon.)
 Star Wars – The Galactic Empire sometimes uses the prefix ISD for Imperial Star Destroyer.
 Babylon 5 – The Earth Alliance uses the prefix "EAS" for "Earth Alliance Ship". Some fan material also uses it for "Earth Alliance Station".
 Elite: Dangerous – The Federation uses the prefix "FNS" (Federal Naval Ship) for some military ships. The Empire uses "INV" (Imperial Naval Vessel). The alliance uses "ADF" (Alliance Defense Force).
 Firefly – Vessels in the Union of Allied Planets fleet are given the prefix "IAV", for Interstellar Alliance Vessel.
 Wing Commander – The Terran Confederation uses TCS (Terran Confederation Ship) for its vessels.
 Halo – United Nations Space Command spacecraft use the prefix "UNSC". The Covenant use three letter designations for ship class such as CAS or CSO
 Mass Effect – features several prefixes, primarily "SSV" for "Systems Alliance space vehicle" and "MSV" for "Merchant Space Vehicle", used on numerous human commercial ships, as well as "PFS" for a Turian Hierarchy naval craft, and a freighter AML Demeter of unknown affiliation.
 Dead Space – "USG", standing for "United Spacefaring Guild", which oversees civilian spacecraft operation, including the planet-cracker class leader USG Ishimura of the Concordance Extraction Corporation; "USM" for the Earth Defense Force of EarthGov; and "CMS" for its former opponents, the Sovereign Colonies Armed Forces.
 StarCraft: Brood War – The United Earth Directorate uses DSS (presumably for Directorate Space Ship, e. g. DSS Aleksander); the Terran Confederacy used CSF (Confederate Space Fleet, e. g. CSF Ragnorak) for their battlecruisers.
 Killzone – The Interplanetary Strategic Alliance (ISA) uses "ISC", for Interplanetary Strategic Cruiser.
 The Moon is a Harsh Mistress – The Federated Nations use "FNS", presumably meaning "Federated Nations Ship".
 Alien – The ships use prefix "USCSS" for "United States Cargo SpaceShip" on the Nostromo, Prometheus, and Covenant.
 The Lost Fleet – The Alliance use the prefix "ASN" for "Allied Systems Navy" (or possibly "Alliance of Systems Navy"), the Syndicate Worlds do not use prefixes.
 CoDominium – CoDominium vessels use the prefix "CDS" for CoDominium Ship.
 "Honorverse" – The Manticoran kingdom uses "HMS" as a prefix, the Graysons use "GNS"(Grayson Navy Ship), and the Havenite ships use "PNS" (People's Navy Ship) and later "RHNS" (Republic of Haven Navy Ship), being reflections of actual ship prefixing traditions, and mirroring the Napoleonic wars. The Solarian League uses "SLNS" (Solarian League Navy Ship) and the Andermani Empire uses "IANS" for Imperial Andermani Navy Ship. 
 The Culture – Ships are identified by a three-letter prefix denoting class (such as GSV for "General Systems Vehicle" or ROU for "Rapid Offensive Unit"), followed by their personal name.
 The Expanse – Ships of the United Nations Navy use the prefix "UNN," while ships of the Martian Congressional Republic Navy are prefixed with "MCRN". The Nauvoo, a generation ship commissioned by the Church of Latter Day Saints was prefixed with "LDSS" for "Latter Day Saints' Ship", and later changed to "OPAS" and re-christened as the "OPAS Behemoth" representing the Outer Planets Alliance.
 Unreal Tournament – Ships mentioned there have prefixes such as ITV ("Interstellar Transport Vessel", the first non-tutorial match in the tournament happens on board of ITV Oblivion) and ISV ("Interstellar Science Vessel", ship's name being ISV-Kran from Unreal).
 Unreal: Return to Na Pali – ISV (ISV-Kran) and UMS ("Unified Military Services", a prefix for warships).
 The Orville—The Planetary Union uses the prefix "USS", presumably for "Union Space Ship" (in homage to Star Trek).
 Treasure Planet: Battle at Procyon - The Terran Empire uses the prefix RLS, which stands for Royal Light Ship; this is also a direct homage to Robert Louis Stevenson, author of the original Treasure Island. The Procyon Expanse uses the prefix PSR, which stands for Procyon Star Runner.
 Destroyermen - the Grand Alliance uses the "USS" prefix, since all Allied warships are run by the Americaan (sic) Clan. The Alliance's only airship is given the prefix "UHAS" (United Homes Air Ship). The Empire of New Britain Isles uses "HIMS" (His/Her Imperial Majesty's Ship). The Republic of Real People uses "RRPS" (Republic of Real People Ship). The New United States uses "NUSS" (New United States Ship). Neither the Holy Dominion nor the League of Tripoli use prefixes, although the KMS Hessen is mentioned once, it isn't clear if the prefix is internally used or not.
Titanfall - The Interstellar Manufacturing Corporation, The Main Antagonists of the Series, Use the "IMS" prefix. The origin of this Prefix is unknown.
FreeSpace - A variety of ship prefixes are used depending on the species, faction allegiance, and class of the vehicle. Prominent examples include: "GT" and "GV" for "Galactic Terran" and "Galactic Vasudan" respectively, "NT" for "Neo-Terran," "PV" for "Parliamentary Vasudan," and just "S" for "Shivan." These are then further supplemented with a type of ship identifier following the species and faction prefixes, such as "B" for "Bomber," "C" for "Cruiser," "Cv" for "Corvette," "D" for "Destroyer," and "F" for "Fighter," among many examples. As such, "PVD" would indicate a "Parliamentary Vasudan Destroyer," "NTF" would indicate a "Neo-Terran Fighter," "GTC" would indicate a "Galactic Terran Cruiser", "GVCv" would indicate a "Galactic Vasudan Corvette," and "SB" would indicate a "Shivan Bomber."

References

Sources

External links 

Warship National Prefixes